Schrankia musalis is a species of moth of the family Erebidae first described by William Schaus in 1916. It is found in Panama.

References

Moths described in 1916
Hypenodinae